Mayotte elects on territorial level a legislature. The Departmental Council (Conseil Départemental) - before March 2015 known as the General Council (Conseil Général) - has 19 members, elected for a three-year term in single seat constituencies. 
Mayotte has a multi-party system, with numerous parties in which no one party often has a chance of gaining power alone, and parties must work with each other to form coalition governments.

See also
Electoral calendar
Electoral system